Phanthong Football Club (Thai: สโมสรฟุตบอลพานทอง) is a Thai semi professional football club based in Phan Thong District of Chonburi Province.

In 2017, Chonburi can send Chonburi B to 2017 Thai League 4 Eastern Region in Thai league system. Phanthong Football Club, which is a deservedly old Chonburi, is collapsed.

Since 2019, the management of the club has completely been changed. They play in Thai League 4 Eastern Region again.

Stadium and locations

Season By Season record

References

External links
 Official Facebookpage of Phanthong FC
 Official Homepage of Phanthong FC

Association football clubs established in 2013
Football clubs in Thailand
Chonburi province
2013 establishments in Thailand